The Roman Catholic Diocese of Sendai is a diocese of the Western Latin Church of the Catholic Church centered in the city of Sendai. It is within the ecclesiastical province of Roman Catholic Archdiocese of Tokyo in Japan.

History
On April 17, 1891, the Roman Catholic Diocese of Hakodate was carved out of the Apostolic Vicariate of Northern Japan.  On March 9, 1936 the diocese was renamed the Diocese of Sendai.

Leadership
Bishop of Sendai:
 Bishop Edgar Cuntapay Gacutan, C.I.C.M. (08 December 2021 – present)
 Bishop Martin Tetsuo Hiraga (マルチノ平賀徹夫) (10 December 2005 – 18 March 2020)
 Bishop Francis Xavier Osamu Mizobe (フランシスコ・ザビエル溝部脩), S.D.B. (2000.05.10 – 2004.05.14)
 Bishop Raymond Augustin Chihiro Sato (ライムンド佐藤千敬), O.P. (1976.01.24 – 1998.06.19)
 Bishop Petro Arikata Kobayashi (ペトロ小林有方) (1954.02.21 – 1976.01.24)
 Bishop Michael Wasaburo Urakawa (ミカエル浦川和三郎) (1941.11.20 – 1954)
 Archbishop Marie-Joseph Lemieux (マリー・ジョゼフ・ルミュー) (1935.12.03 – 1941.01.16)
 Bishop of Hakodate:
 Fr. Andre Dumas, O.P. (Apostolic Administrator 1931 – 1936)
 Bishop Alexandre Berlioz (アレキサンドル・ベルリオーズ), M.E.P. (1891.04.24 – 1927.07.25)

See also

Roman Catholicism in Japan

Sources

 GCatholic.org
 Catholic Hierarchy
  Diocese website

External links 

 http://www.cbcj.catholic.jp/jpn/diocese/sendai.htm

Roman Catholic dioceses in Japan
Religious organizations established in 1891
Roman Catholic dioceses and prelatures established in the 19th century
1891 establishments in Japan